Ortberg is a surname. Notable people with the surname include:

Daniel Mallory Ortberg (born 1986), American author
John Ortberg (born 1957), American evangelical Christian

See also
Östberg